Harold Mayot (born 4 February 2002) is a French tennis player. He has a career high ATP singles ranking of world No. 248 achieved on 19 September 2022. He also has a career high ATP doubles ranking of world No. 443 achieved on 1 August 2022. Mayot has reached 1 ATP Challenger Tour final and 4 singles ITF finals, with a record of 2 wins and 2 losses, as well as 2 doubles ITF finals with a record of 1 win and 1 loss.

Junior career
As a junior, Mayot reached his highest ranking of number 1 in the world in the combined singles and doubles ITF junior ranking system, which he reached on 3 February 2020 and sustained to end the year as the number one male juniors player in the world. This was highlighted by a winning the championship at the 2020 Australian Open where he defeated compatriot Arthur Cazaux in straight sets 6–4, 6–1.

Professional career

2020: Grand Slam singles and doubles debut
Mayot made his ATP main draw debut at the 2020 Open 13 simultaneously in both single and doubles when he was granted a wildcard entry into both draws. Partnering compatriot Arthur Cazaux. They were defeated in the first round by Nicolas Mahut and Vasek Pospisil in straight sets. He was also defeated in the singles first round by veteran compatriot Gilles Simon in straight sets 4–6, 6–7(3–7).

Pairing with Cazaux again, they were given a wildcard entry into the main doubles draw of the 2020 French Open but would again be defeated in the first round by Lukasz Kubot and Marcelo Melo in straight sets. At the same tournament Mayot received also a wildcard into the singles main draw, and was defeated by Alejandro Davidovich Fokina 6–7(5–7), 3–6, 5–7.

2022: First ATP Challenger final, top 250 debut
Mayot received a wildcard for the qualifying competition at the 2022 Australian Open.

Mayot reached his first ATP Challenger Tour final as a qualifier in July 2022 at the 2022 Tampere Open in Finland, losing against Zsombor Piros. As a result he reached a new career-high singles ranking of No. 304 and also a doubles ranking of No. 450 on 25 July 2022. He reached the top 250 at world No. 248 on 19 September 2022.

ATP Challenger and ITF World Tennis Tour finals

Singles: 5 (2–3)

Doubles: 2 (1–1)

Junior Grand Slam finals

Singles: 1 (1 title)

Performance timelines

Singles

Doubles

References

External links

2002 births
Living people
French male tennis players
Sportspeople from Metz
Australian Open (tennis) junior champions
Grand Slam (tennis) champions in boys' singles